Hooton Pagnell is a civil parish in the metropolitan borough of Doncaster, South Yorkshire, England.  The parish contains 36 listed buildings that are recorded in the National Heritage List for England.  Of these, one is listed at Grade I, the highest of the three grades, one is at Grade II*, the middle grade, and the others are at Grade II, the lowest grade. The parish contains the village of Hooton Pagnell and the surrounding countryside.  Most of the listed buildings are houses, cottages and associated structures, farmhouses and farm buildings.  The other listed buildings include a church and a cross base and shaft in the churchyard, a village cross, a former summer house, and a former smithy.


Key

Buildings

References

Citations

Sources

 

Lists of listed buildings in South Yorkshire
Buildings and structures in the Metropolitan Borough of Doncaster